Baloghia is a genus of arachnids in the family Haplozetidae. There are at least two described species in Baloghia.

Species
 Baloghia juditae Mahunka, 1994
 Baloghia spinifera Mahunka, 1994

References

Further reading

 
 

Sarcoptiformes